Fort Savage Raiders is a 1951 American Western film directed by Ray Nazarro and written by Barry Shipman. Released in March 1951 by Columbia Pictures, the production stars Charles Starrett and Smiley Burnette, with John Dehner, Trevor Bardette, and Dusty Walker in principal supporting roles.

Plot

Cast          
Charles Starrett as Steve Drake / The Durango Kid
Smiley Burnette as Smiley Burnette
John Dehner as Captain Michael Craydon
Trevor Bardette as Old Cuss
Peter M. Thompson as Lt. James Sutter 
Fred F. Sears as Colonel Sutter 
John Cason as Gus
Frank Griffin as Rog Beck
Sam Flint as Colonel Markham
Dusty Walker as Musician

References

External links
 

1951 films
1950s English-language films
American Western (genre) films
1951 Western (genre) films
Columbia Pictures films
Films directed by Ray Nazarro
American black-and-white films
1950s American films